W. Perkins was an early footballer who played for Newark and Burslem Port Vale in the 1900s.

Career
Perkins played for Newark, before signing for Burslem Port Vale in May 1902. He made his debut at the Athletic Ground in a 1–1 draw with Blackpool on 6 September 1902. He scored his first goal for the club on 4 October, in a 2–2 draw with Small Heath, and made a total of 32 Second Division appearances in the 1902–03 season. He played 27 league and seven FA Cup appearances in the 1903–04 campaign, and scored goals against Lincoln City and Stockport County. He returned to Newark in 1904.

Career statistics
Source:

References

Year of birth missing
Year of death missing
Association football midfielders
Newark Town F.C. players
Port Vale F.C. players
English Football League players
English footballers